Yassa is a spicy dish prepared with onions and either marinated poultry, marinated fish or marinated lamb. Originally from Senegal, yassa has become popular throughout West Africa. Chicken yassa (known as yassa au poulet), prepared with onions, lemon or mustard, is a specialty from the Casamance region in the south of Senegal. Other meats used for yassa are lamb and fish.

See also
 List of African dishes
 List of chicken dishes
 List of fish dishes

References

External links
 Poulet Yassa recipe

African cuisine
Casamance
Chicken dishes
Fish dishes
Mauritanian cuisine
Senegalese cuisine